Rubén de la Cuesta Vera (born 11 September 1981 in Córdoba, Andalusia), known as Cuesta, is a retired Spanish professional footballer who played as a central midfielder.

Career
After announcing his retirement in February 2019, Cuesta began working as a coordinator for his former youth club Séneca CF.

References

External links

1981 births
Living people
Footballers from Córdoba, Spain
Spanish footballers
Association football midfielders
Segunda División players
Segunda División B players
Córdoba CF B players
Córdoba CF players
Écija Balompié players
Atlético Madrid B players
Zamora CF footballers
CD Guadalajara (Spain) footballers
Lucena CF players
Real Balompédica Linense footballers
FC Jumilla players
Bolivian Primera División players
Universitario de Sucre footballers
Oriente Petrolero players
Club Real Potosí players
Atlético Sanluqueño CF players
Club Always Ready players
Spanish expatriate footballers
Expatriate footballers in Bolivia
Spanish expatriate sportspeople in Bolivia